Prutskovsky is a rural locality (a khutor) in Duplaytskoye Rural Settlement, Novonikolayevsky District, Volgograd Oblast, Russia. The population was 148 as of 2010. There are 6 streets.

Geography 
Prutskovsky is located in steppe, on the Khopyorsko-Buzulukskaya Plain, 25 km northwest of Novonikolayevsky (the district's administrative centre) by road. Kosarka is the nearest rural locality.

References 

Rural localities in Novonikolayevsky District